Below is a list of current and former broadcast announcers for the Tokyo Broadcasting System, its spin-offs, and predecessor entities.

Current announcers

Male or man 

 joined in 1983
 joined in 1986
 joined in 1988
 joined in 1988
 joined in 1989
 joined in 1989
 joined in 1991
 joined in 1993
 joined in 1993
 joined in 1994
 joined in 1996
 joined in 1996
 joined in 1997
 joined in 1997
 joined in 1998
 joined in 1998
 joined in 1999
 joined in 2001
 joined in 2003
 joined in 2004
 joined in 2004
 joined in 2006
 joined in 2007
 joined in 2007
 joined in 2008
 joined in 2010
 joined in 2013
 joined in 2013
 joined in 2017
 joined in 2018
 joined in 2019
 joined in 2020
 joined in 2020
 joined in 2021
 joined in 2021

Female or woman

 joined in 1987
 joined in 1991
 joined in 1994
 joined in 1995
 joined in 1995
 joined in 1997
 joined in 1998
 joined in 
 joined in 2000
 joined in 2000
 joined in 2003
 joined in 2005
 joined in 2006
 joined in 2006
 joined in 2008
 joined in 2009
 joined in 2011
 joined in 2013
 joined in 2014
 joined in 2015
 joined in 2015
 joined in 2016
 joined in 2016
 joined in 2017
 joined in 2017
 joined in 2018
 joined in 2018
 joined in 2018
 joined in 2019
 joined in 2019
 joined in 2019
 joined in 2020
 joined in 2021
 joined in 2022

Former announcers

Retired announcers

Male 
 (1951-1959); now as a narrator, he is in charge of "National Theater" (Mito Komon, Ooka Echizen, etc.). He died in October 1990 
 (1954-1986)
 (1955-1985)
 (1955-1992)
 (1955-1983)
 (1967–1979); now as freelance announcer
 (1969-2005); now as Director, Producer, transferred to the entertainment office "CMA (→ Cast Plus)" He also served as Managing Director, President and Representative Director, and Advisor to Directors. He died in 2013.
 (1972-2006) now as Former NHK announcerlater director of "JNN News Feature", desk of "NEWS23", producer of "World Heritage"
 (1981–2017); now as TBS Radio News Desk
 (1981-2017); now as  TBS Radio's news desk and full-time faculty member of the Department of Newspapers, Faculty of Law, Nihon University
 (1988 - 1991); now as Content Business in Bureau
 (1996-2005); now as Production Department Variety Production Department. Currently "COUNT DOWN TV" producer etc.
 (2014-2019); now as News Department)

Female 
 (1962-1966)
 (1968-1973); now as Free announcer, essayist, journalist, vice president of Aomori University, professor of the Faculty of Sociology. 
 (1968-2003)
 (1983-1990)
 (1993–1999); now as freelance announcer
 (1994–2001)
 (1995–2010); now as tarento and radio personality
 (1996 -2018); now as Secretary's Office
 (1999–2008); now as freelance announcer
 (2001–2012); now lives in Argentina
 (2002–2007); died in 2008
 (2002–2012); now as UNHCR staff
 (2003–2009); now as freelance announcer
 (2005–2012); now as freelance announcer
 (2005–2010); now as freelance announcer
 (2008–2015); now as freelance announcer
 (2009–2014); now as freelance announcer
 (2010–2016)
 (2009–2017); now as a professional soccer player from Urawa Reds
 (2011-2019)
 (2012-2019)
 (2011-2019) now as a former fencing player.
 (2014-2019)
 (2016-2021)

Announcers
Tokyo Broadcasting System announcers